Desecration is the act of depriving something of its sacred character, or the disrespectful, contemptuous, or destructive treatment of that which is held to be sacred or holy by a group or individual.

Overview
Many consider acts of desecration to be sacrilegious acts. This can include desecration of sacred books, sacred places or sacred objects. Desecration generally may be considered from the perspective of a particular religion or spiritual activity. Desecration may be applied to natural systems or components, particularly if those systems are part of naturalistic spiritual religion.

To respectfully remove the sacred character of a place or an object is deconsecration, and is distinct from desecration.

Some religions, such as the Roman Catholic Church have specific rules as to what constitutes desecration and what should be done in these circumstances.

Examples

In Judaism

In Judaism, the "Desecration of God's Name" meaning the desecration of any aspect of Judaism and its beliefs and practices as commanded in the Torah and Jewish Law and hence of God, is known as Chillul Hashem from the Hebrew meaning "[the] Desecration [of] the Name [of] God". In some instances to avoid Chillul Hashem Judaism would require that its adherents die as martyrs.

The opposite or converse of Chillul Hashem in Judaism is Kiddush Hashem meaning "Sanctification [of] the Name of God".

Christianization of the Roman Empire
Examples of the destruction of pagan temples in the late fourth century, as recorded in surviving texts, describe Martin of Tours' attacks on holy sites in Gaul, the destruction of temples in Syria by Marcellus the destruction of temples and images in, and surrounding, Carthage, the Patriarch Theophilus who seized and destroyed pagan temples in Alexandria, the levelling of all the temples in Gaza and the wider destruction of holy sites that spread rapidly throughout Egypt. This is supplemented in abundance by archaeological evidence in the northern provinces exposing broken and burnt out buildings and hastily buried objects of piety. The leader of the Egyptian monks who participated in the sack of temples replied to the victims who demanded back their sacred icons:
I peacefully removed your gods...there is no such thing as robbery for those who truly possess Christ.

At the turn of the century St Augustine gave a sermon to his congregation in Carthage on removing all tangible symbols of paganism:
Am I saying "Stop wanting what you want"? On the contrary, we must be thankful that you want what God wants. That every superstition of the pagans and the Gentiles should be abolished is what God wants, God has ordered, God has foretold, God has begun to bring about, and in many parts of the world has already in great measure achieved.

In the year 407 a decree was issued to the west from Rome: 
If any images stand even now in the temples and shrines...., they shall be torn from their foundations...The temples situated in cities or towns shall be taken for public use. Altars shall be destroyed in all places.
Sacred sites were now appropriated by Christianity: "Let altars be built and relics be placed there" wrote Pope Gregory I, "so that [the pagans] have to change from the worship of the daemones to that of the true God."

Red Terror in Spain 

The Red Terror in Spain during the Spanish Civil War involved massive desecration of churches, synagogues and other sacred objects and places by leftists. On the night of 19 July 1936 alone, 50 churches were burned. In Barcelona, out of the 58 churches, only the Cathedral was spared, and similar events occurred almost everywhere in Republican Spain. All the Catholic churches in the Republican zone were closed, but the attacks were not limited to Catholic churches, as synagogues were also pillaged and closed, but some small Protestant churches were spared.

Bosnia and Herzegovina
The ethnic cleansing campaign that took place throughout areas controlled by the Army of the Republika Srpska (VRS) targeted Bosnian Muslims, and included the destruction of Muslim places of worship.

Kosovo
Numerous Albanian cultural sites in Kosovo were destroyed during the Kosovo conflict (1998-1999) which constituted a war crime violating the Hague and Geneva Conventions. In all 225 out of 600 mosques in Kosovo were damaged, vandalised, or destroyed alongside other Islamic architecture during the conflict. Archives belonging to the Islamic Community of Kosovo with records spanning 500 years were also destroyed. During the war, Islamic architectural heritage posed for Yugoslav Serb paramilitary and military forces as Albanian patrimony with destruction of non-Serbian architectural heritage being a methodical and planned component of ethnic cleansing in Kosovo.

Revenge attacks against Serbian religious sites commenced following the conflict and the return of hundreds of thousands of Kosovo Albanian refugees to their homes. During violent unrest in 2004, more than 35 Serbian Orthodox church buildings were desecrated, damaged or destroyed.

See also
 Desecration of graves
 Desacralization of knowledge
 Flag desecration
 Host desecration
 Qur'an desecration
 Vandalism

References

Religious belief and doctrine
Religious persecution
Religious discrimination